Florence Kate Arliss (née Montgomery; 29 July 1870 – 12 March 1950) was an English actress. She was married to George Arliss with whom she often costarred. She played his wife in films like Disraeli, The Millionaire, and The House of Rothschild.

On 12 March 1950, Arliss died in her home in London.

Filmography

References

External links 

 
 

19th-century English actresses
English stage actresses
English film actresses
1870 births
1950 deaths
British expatriate actresses in the United States